The Chios massacre (in) was a catastrophe that resulted in the death, enslavement, and flight of about four-fifths of the total population of Greeks on the island of Chios by Ottoman troops, during the Greek War of Independence in 1822. Greeks from neighboring islands had arrived on Chios and encouraged the Chiotes (the native inhabitants of the island) to join their revolt. In response, Ottoman troops landed on the island and killed thousands. The massacre of Christians provoked international outrage across the Western world, and led to increasing support for the Greek cause worldwide.

Background

For over 2,000 years, merchants and shipowners from Chios had been prominent in trade and diplomacy throughout the Black Sea, the Aegean, and the Mediterranean. The Ottoman Empire allowed Chios almost complete control over its own affairs as Chioten trade and the very highly valued mastic plant, harvested only on Chios, were of great value to the Ottomans. The cosmopolitan Chiotes were also very prominent in Constantinople. Following the massacre, however, the island never regained its commercial prominence.

The island's ruling classes were reluctant to join the Greek revolt, fearing the loss of their security and prosperity. Furthermore, they were aware that they were situated far too close to the Turkish heartland in Anatolia to be safe. At some points, Chios is only  from the Anatolian mainland.

Massacre
In March 1822, as the Greek revolt gathered strength on the mainland, several hundred armed Greeks from the neighbouring island of Samos landed in Chios. They attacked the Turks, who retreated to the citadel. Many islanders also decided to join the revolution. However, the vast majority of the population had by all accounts done nothing to provoke the reprisals, and had not joined other Greeks in their revolt against the Ottoman Empire.

Reinforcements in the form of a Turkish fleet under the Kapudan Pasha Nasuhzade Ali Pasha arrived on the island on 22 March. They quickly pillaged and looted the town. On , orders were given to burn down the town, and over the next four months, an estimated 30,000 Turkish troops arrived. In addition to setting fires, the troops were ordered to kill all infants under three years old, all males 12 years and older, and all females 40 and older, except those willing to convert to Islam. The British warship HMS Seringapatam was on duty in the Mediterranean under the command of Captain Samuel Warren. On 7 May she passed the island of Chios (then called Scio in English), saw it in flames, and received signals from Greek ships asking for help, but being under orders to observe strict neutrality in the Greek War of Independence the ship gave no assistance and proceeded on her way. Approximately four-fifths of the total population of 100,000 to 120,000 prior of the catastrophe, were killed, enslaved, or had to take refuge outside of Chios; it is estimated that 25,000 were killed, 45,000 enslaved, and 10,000 to 20,000 refuged. Tens of thousands of survivors dispersed throughout Europe and became part of the Chian diaspora. Some young Greeks enslaved during the massacre were adopted by wealthy Ottomans and converted to Islam. Some rose to levels of prominence in the Ottoman Empire, such as Georgios Stravelakis (later renamed Mustapha Khaznadar) and Ibrahim Edhem Pasha.

Reaction and commemoration
There was outrage when the events were reported in Europe and French painter Eugène Delacroix created a painting depicting the events that occurred; his painting was named Scenes from the Massacres of Chios. Thomas Barker of Bath painted a fresco of the massacre on the walls of Doric House, Bath, Somerset.

A draft of this painting, created under the supervision of Delacroix in his lab by one of his students, is in display in the Athens War Museum. In 2009, a copy of the painting was displayed in the local Byzantine museum on Chios. It was withdrawn from the museum in November 2009 in a "good faith initiative" for the improvement of Greek-Turkish relations. However, the Greek press protested its removal. The copy is now back on display in the museum.

During a session of the Permanent Holy Synod of the Orthodox Church of Greece in Athens on July 14–15, 2021, at the proposal of Metropolitan Markos of Chios, Psara and Oinousses, the Holy Synod glorified Metropolitan Plato of Chios, and 43 others, who were martyred by Ottoman troops in the Chios Massacre on Holy Friday in 1822. The list included priests, deacons, hieromonks and monks, to be commemorated on the Sunday of the Paralytic each year.

Gallery

See also
 Chios expedition
 Destruction of Psara
 List of massacres in Greece
 Massacres during the Greek Revolution
 Navarino massacre
 Ottoman wars in Europe
 Tripolitsa massacre

Footnotes

References

Further reading
 Christopher A. Long – The Series of Events
 The Massacres of Chios Described in Contemporary Diplomatic Reports, edited and with an introduction by Philip P. Argenti (London: John Lane the Bodley Head Ltd., 1932).

External links
  is a poetic response to the massacre by Felicia Hemans, first published in The Literary Souvenir annual for 1830, with an engraving by Henry Rolls of a painting by A. Phalipon.

1822 in Greece
Amphibious operations
Battles of the Greek War of Independence
Conflicts in 1822
Massacres committed by the Ottoman Empire
Massacres during the Greek War of Independence
Massacres in Greece
Massacres in the Ottoman Empire
Ottoman Chios
Persecution of Greeks in the Ottoman Empire before the 20th century
Sieges involving Greece
Sieges involving the Ottoman Empire